Kathlamet was a Chinookan language that was spoken around the border of Washington and Oregon by the Kathlamet people. The most extensive records of the language were made by Franz Boas, and a grammar was documented in the dissertation of Dell Hymes. It became extinct in the 1930s and there is little text left of it.

Kathlamet was spoken in northwestern Oregon along the south bank of the lower Columbia River. It has been classified as a dialect of Upper Chinook, or as Lower Chinook, but was mutually intelligible with neither.

Phonology
All of the Chinookan languages feature what Mithun (1999) describes as "rich consonant inventor(y) typical of [languages native to] the Northwest coast" and "elaborate phonological processes".

Consonants

Boas (1911b) reports that Kathlamet consonant clusters are defined by their position to the word initial, medial and final and the phonemic syllable initial and final. In sequences of consonant where a continuant occurs as nucleus, consonants following the nucleus are taken to appear the separate clusters, the nucleus in none.

Vowels

Kathlamet lacks many of the distinguishing features found among the dialects of Upper Chinook including extensive use of sound symbolism, pervasive intervocalic voicing of consonants, and an elaborate tense prefix system. It also features a different collection of initial nominal prefixes and some additional morphemes, such as independent pronouns. (Mithun 1999)
The glides  are analyzed as allophones of the high vowels.

Morphology
Kathlamet has four major word classes: pronouns, nouns, verbs, and articles. Pronoun words are always members of the pronominal stem class. And there are two subclasses of pronoun stems. The first stems of subclass occur with prefixes marking 1st, 2nd and 3rd person. The second stems of subclass occur with prefixed only marking 3rd person. Nouns can be inflected for the initial prefixes, possessive pronominal prefixes and initial prefixes (as nominalizers), in which in similar in form to the prefixes of demonstratives prefixes of verbs. Possessive pronominal prefixes may be inflected for person and number for gender and number prefixes. Verbs may contain initial tense prefixes. Unlike noun and pronoun words, verb may show more than one occurrence of the paradigm. The number of occurrences ranges from one to three mostly by relative order position, partly by special forms. Nouns may be used with the pronominal prefix as an absolutive. Verbs also are used as nominal. Nouns stem belonging to a joint class, such as VN, NP and VNP. Nouns can come in two different types; a simple noun, which is a single stem morpheme; and complex nouns, which have an apparent sequence. Similar to English, adverbials in Kathlamet may be used to indicate directional relations, such as "with" "for" "near" "toward" "out".(Mithun 1999)

Morphemes in Kathlamet can be placed in one of three categories: stems, prefixes, or suffixes. Prefixes can be either derivational or grammatical, where the derivational helps make up a word base. Grammatical prefixes are less common but have more flexibility in their shape.

Person, Number and Gender
Kathlamet nouns form plural in relation to patterns involving the classificatory prefixes and plural suffixes. There are four group groups of affixes in Kathlamet.

Singular: i-, a-, L-
Plural: -ks, max
Dual: s-
Number opposite of singular and plural:t-, L-

The gender categories are extended to all nouns. Kathlamet has 1st, 2nd, 3rd, 4th person, dual and plural possessors.

Positions
Kathlmat noun occurs with both prefixation and sufiixiation. The noun stem has limited complexity. The minimum noun word: prefix plus single stem. And the minimum sequence is classificatory prefix plus possessive inflection plus stem.

Kathlamet contains 7 positions in a noun form.

One case
Pronoun words in Kathlamet are always members of the pronominal stem class. There are two subclasses of pronoun stems. The first subclass of stems occurs with prefixes marking 1st, 2nd and 3rd person. The second subclass of stems occurs with prefixes only marking 3rd person. The plural suffix for human beings is found only in first stems of subclass. The function of the second stems of subclass is noticeably demonstrative. The stems for one are the only numerals not classed as particles, and these occur with 3rd person singular prefixes. They distinguish masculine and feminine gender. From Boas (1901):

    The stems of subclass one are:
        -ai-        	     person
     			     m-ai-ka  	you(174.11)
                             i-ai-ma  	he only(70.14)
                             t-ai-ci    those (26.1)
       -a.ni.ua              first
                   	     m-a.ni.ua  you first(87.6)

    The stems of subclass two are:
    -ax  -aXi – uXi 	     person, demonstrative
                   	     i-ax-ka   	      he/it (55.9/11.5)
                       	     t-aXi     	      those (73.60
                             u-uXi     	      that （91.4）

    -ixui -ixaui –iqui 	      quantity(of time, items)
                      	      -uxui            many（11.01）
                              L-axui           much（250.16）

     -iXat         	      one(person)
                              a-ixat           one maiden（20.1）
     -iXt                     one(other than person)
                   	      a-iXt    	        one basket（15.4）
     -kun                     other, another
             		      a-kun    	        another woman（162.3）

Arguments

Pronominal affixes are used in Kathlamet for identifying arguments. It doesn't conjoin noun phrases. One entity is with a full noun phrase and established as topic. A dual or plural pronoun is enough to point to the joint participation. Below are two examples from Boas (1901):

The same strategy can be used to identify 3rd person members of first and second plural arguments. Because there is the context, pronominal reference is sufficient to identify them. For example：

Space, Time, Modality

Kathlamet shows a four-way tense distinction: future, present (non-completive), immediate past, (aorist) and non- immediate: a-, zero, i-, na-/qa-.Below are examples from Boas (1901):

      a-ms-k- ú-naxL-am-a        you will search for her(163.1)
      i- ú-s-c-x                 he went down river (73.2)
      i-k-i-x-kí-Li-na           she strings them(192.10)
      s- ú-pna ́́́-na               jumping(110.16)

The suffix –tiX relation to time and –pa relation to space. And –tiX after vowel, -pa after consonants. Below are examples from Boas (1901):

     núLʔ-ka-tiX                      little while only(266.15)
     qá.ua-tiX                        several times(90.3)
     kú-pa                            there(10.6)
     pa íu-kua                        noon=there day(88.8)

Revitalization
The Lower Chinook people were reduced to a handful of survivors by epidemics in 1829, resulting in the loss of their distinct languages and their disappearance as a clan entity. The Upper Chinook people have survived a while longer, but of their many languages, only Wasco-Wishram survives. In fact, Wasco-Wishram is the only surviving branch of the entire Chinookan language family. Sometimes classified as distinct dialects, the dual dialects of Wasco and Wishram are mutually intelligible so as to be considered the same essential language. They differ only in one phoneme and a few lexical terms (Hymes, 1961).

In 1990 there were 69 speakers (7 monolinguals) of Wasco-Wishram. The final native speaker of Wasco, Gladys Thompson, died in 2012, but not before the language was passed down in part to Deanie Johnson and Val Switzler, both members of the Warm Springs Indian reservation. Both began providing instruction in Wasco-Wishram to other members of the tribe in 2006, but neither Johnson nor Switzler is considered fully fluent.

The last fully fluent speakers of the Wishram dialect, meanwhile, lived in the Yakima reservation in Washington State; all died sometime between 2000 and 2013.

The use and demise of the other Chinookan dialects is too poorly documented to determine when they were last spoken, but collections of text and some grammatical treatments remain, most notably for Shoalwater, Kathlamet, and Clackamas.

References

Mithun, Marianne. (1999). The languages of Native North America. Cambridge: Cambridge University Press.  (hbk); .

"Honors Confederated Tribes of Warm Springs elder Gladys Miller Thompson for her contribution to preserving Native languages of Oregon.". 74th OREGON LEGISLATIVE ASSEMBLY—2007 Regular Session. Retrieved 2013-02-26.

Hymes, Dell. "A Pattern Of Verbal Irony In Chinookan." International Journal of the Sociology of Language 1987.65 (1987): 97-110. Communication & Mass Media Complete. Web. 4 Feb. 2014.

Keith Chu (2006-07-30). "New speakers try to save language". The Bulletin (Bend, OR). Retrieved 2013-02-25.

Kristian Foden-Vencil (2012-07-17). "Last Fluent Speaker Of Oregon Tribal Language 'Kiksht' Dies". Oregon Public Broadcasting. Retrieved 2013-02-26.

"Lewis & Clark—Tribes—Wasco Indians". National Geographic. Retrieved 2013-02-25.

The Confederated Tribes of Warm Springs Reservation of Oregon. 2009 (retrieved 9 April 2009)

Further reading

External links
"Kathlamet language," Native-Languages.org

Chinookan languages
Indigenous languages of Oregon
Indigenous languages of the Pacific Northwest Coast
Extinct languages of North America
Verb–subject–object languages
Languages extinct in the 1930s
1930s disestablishments in Oregon